Wang Yu (born 18 August 1991 in Zhuhai) is a Chinese athlete specializing in the high jump. He won the bronze medal at the 2013 Summer Universiade in Kazan.

He has personal bests of 2.33 metres outdoors (Beijing 2013) and 2.34 metres indoors (PSD Bank Meeting, Düsseldorf 2019, NR).

In 2019, his season best is 2.31 m in	Nanjing (CHN), on 21 May 2019.

Competition record

1Did not start in the final

References

1991 births
Living people
Chinese male high jumpers
Athletes (track and field) at the 2014 Asian Games
Athletes (track and field) at the 2018 Asian Games
World Athletics Championships athletes for China
Athletes (track and field) at the 2016 Summer Olympics
Athletes (track and field) at the 2020 Summer Olympics
Olympic athletes of China
Universiade medalists in athletics (track and field)
Asian Games medalists in athletics (track and field)
Asian Games gold medalists for China
Medalists at the 2018 Asian Games
Universiade bronze medalists for China
Asian Games gold medalists in athletics (track and field)
Competitors at the 2011 Summer Universiade
Medalists at the 2013 Summer Universiade
21st-century Chinese people